The Honest Ads Act (S. 1989, H.R. 4077) was a bill in the United States Senate intended to regulate online campaign advertisements by companies. The bill was proposed on October 19, 2017, as a response to Facebook's disclosure of Russia purchasing political ads during the 2016 United States presidential election. The Honest Ads Act was eventually incorporated into the For the People Act, which has passed the House but stalled in the Senate during the 116th and 117th Congresses.

Background and content 

Political ads on television, newspapers, and on the radio are all currently required to disclose the names of those who paid for the advertisement under the Federal Election Campaign Act of 1971, but this is not a requirement online. The bill would amend the 1971 law to make "reasonable efforts" to ensure ads are not purchased "directly or indirectly" by foreign countries. The legislation would require companies to disclose how advertisements were targeted as well as how much the ads cost.

The Act was a bipartisan bill sponsored by Senators Amy Klobuchar (D-MN), Mark Warner (D-VA), and John McCain (R-AZ). The companion version to S. 1989 in the United States House of Representatives, H.R. 4077, was sponsored by Representative Derek Kilmer (D-WA).

Reaction 
The Interactive Advertising Bureau has argued against regulation as being too restrictive, in favor instead for self-regulation. Facebook has publicly supported the bill, although campaign transparency advocates have accused the company of lobbying against it.

See also 

 For the People Act
 Russian interference in the 2016 United States elections
 Bipartisan Campaign Reform Act

References 

Amy Klobuchar
Campaign finance in the United States
John McCain
Proposed legislation of the 115th United States Congress
Campaign finance reform in the United States
Federal Election Commission